The Midland County Educational Service Agency (MCESA) is an intermediate school district in Michigan, headquartered in Midland.

Most of Midland County is served by the Midland County Educational Service Agency, which coordinates the efforts of local boards of education, but has no operating authority over schools. Local school boards in Michigan retain great autonomy over day-to-day operations.

History
The district was formed in 1962 when the Michigan Legislature created intermediate school districts in each county in the state.

Composition
The Midland County Educational Service Agency includes many public school districts, private schools, charter schools, colleges, and facilities.

Governance
The Midland County Educational Service Agency is governed by a publicly elected board of education, which is responsible for hiring a superintendent to serve as the chief administrative officer of the agency.

Public school districts
As of the 2014-2015 school year, the communities of Midland County are served by the following members of the Midland County Educational Service Agency:
 Bullock Creek Public Schools
 Coleman Community Schools
 Meridian Public Schools
 Midland Public Schools

Private schools
The Midland County Educational Service Agency includes private parochial schools.

Charter schools
The Midland County Educational Service Agency includes charter schools, such as the Academic and Career Education Academy, the Midland Academy of Advanced and Creative Studies, and Windover High School.

See also
 List of intermediate school districts in Michigan

References

External links
 

Education in Midland County, Michigan
Intermediate school districts in Michigan